Skillingaryd is a locality in Vaggeryd Municipality, Jönköping County, Sweden, with  over 13,200 inhabitants in 2013. Together with Vaggeryd, the seat of Vaggeryd Municipality.

Skillingaryd is an old industrial town with many large companies such as Thor Ahlgren AB, Kinnarps, Krahners, Presso, Skillmech, Stilexo, Stack Hydraulic, and Mechanical Uppåkra AB. The town lies on the railway line Halmstad Nässjö, formerly part of the Halmstad-Nässjö Railways, HNJ. Skillingaryd is also known for the Skillingaryd firing range, which still works as a military firing and training ground. Skillingaryd is also associated with the Skillingaryd ointment.

Carpentry
The city has an abundance of carpentry. Many old houses have been preserved, and there are many open porches with ornate design details. Beautiful iron roofs and old gates are found mainly in the older parts of Skillingaryd.

Military
The Western Camp and military museum have been used for military marching exercises since the 1680s. The heath borders Main Street and along streets lined with foliage, there are vast moors and the wooden houses of the Western camp. The area is still used for military purposes.

Coffee Street
You find the historic environment along Coffee Street just north of the western camp. The military often took their coffee breaks here and, as the street name reveals, this embossed business on Coffee Street from the turn of the century until the 1940s and 1950s. Several of the picturesque houses remain.

Skillingehus is the home of the municipal administration, but some services are in Vaggeryd.

References

External links
Skillingaryd.nu
Vaggeryd Municipality

Populated places in Jönköping County
Populated places in Vaggeryd Municipality
Municipal seats of Jönköping County
Swedish municipal seats
Finnveden